Whooping Crane Summer Range is a 16,895-km2 wetland complex in the boreal forests of northern Alberta and southwestern Northwest Territories in Canada. It is the only natural nesting habitat for the endangered whooping crane. On May 24, 1982, it was designated a Ramsar wetland of international importance, one of two such sites in Wood Buffalo National Park (the other is Peace-Athabasca Delta). It is owned by the government of Canada, and is administered by Parks Canada with some input from Indian and Northern Affairs Canada. Encompassing the northeastern portion of Wood Buffalo National Park, about 2,300 km2 (14%) of the wetland is external to the park, on Crown land in the Northwest Territories. It is also classified an Important Bird Area.

The range is a complex of contiguous water bodies, primarily lakes and various wetlands, such as marshes and bogs, but also includes streams and ponds. In addition to the whooping crane nesting area, the range includes two sites classified during the International Biological Program.

Because the area developed through wildfires, "no natural forest fires in the area are extinguished unless they threaten structural facilities or...leave the boundaries of Wood Buffalo National Park".

A whooping crane census in 1941 counted only 15 migratory birds. Currently, 178 migratory birds winter and breed in coastal Texas, primarily in the Aransas National Wildlife Refuge. Annual population surveys are conducted by the Canadian Wildlife Service. A few breeding pairs of the  peregrine falcon also nest in the range. Due to the significant threat of extinction of whooping cranes, access to nesting sites is strictly controlled, limited only to researchers and park staff, and low-flying aircraft are prohibited in the area.

References

Ramsar sites in Canada
Landforms of Alberta
Landforms of the Northwest Territories
Important Bird Areas of the Northwest Territories
Wetlands of Canada
Wood Buffalo National Park
Important Bird Areas of Alberta
Protected areas established in 1982
1982 establishments in Alberta